Alburnus timarensis also known as the Karasu sha kuli, is a species of Cyprinidae fish endemic to a single stream in the Lake Van basin in eastern Turkey. The species was considered a synonym of Alburnus tarichi, but was revealed to be a separate species.

References

Alburnus
Fish described in 1980